The 13th Annual Screen Actors Guild Awards ceremony, honoring the best in American film and television acting achievement for the year 2006, took place on January 28, 2007, at the Los Angeles Shrine Exposition Center, in Los Angeles, California. It was the 11th consecutive year the ceremony was held at the center. The nominees were announced on January 4, 2007, and the award ceremony was televised live on TNT and TBS. 2007 was the 10th consecutive year TNT televised the event and the second year for TBS.

Babel, Dreamgirls and Little Miss Sunshine received the highest number of nominations among the film categories, with each getting three, two for acting and one for ensemble performance, however only Dreamgirls won more than one award. In the television categories The Sopranos and Broken Trail had the most nominations, with three but it was the mini-series Elizabeth I and the medical drama Grey's Anatomy which won the most awards, with two each.

The Screen Actors Guild Life Achievement Award was presented to actress-singer Julie Andrews.

Winners and nominees
Winners are listed first and highlighted in boldface.

Screen Actors Guild Life Achievement Award 
 Julie Andrews

Film

Television

In Memoriam
Anne Hathaway presented a filmed tribute to the actors who died in 2006:

 Dennis Weaver
 Edward Albert
 Robert Earl Jones
 Mickey Hargitay
 Phyllis Kirk
 Barnard Hughes
 Henderson Forsythe
 Peter Boyle
 Robert Cornthwaite
 Mako Iwamatsu
 Lee Zimmer
 Jane Wyatt
 Robert Sterling
 Moira Shearer
 Red Buttons
 Fayard Nicholas
 Paul Gleason
 June Allyson
 Arthur Franz
 Dana Reeve
 Bruno Kirby
 Richard Stahl
 Robert Donner
 Darren McGavin
 Maureen Stapleton
 Arthur Hill
 Chris Penn
 Frances Bergen
 Elizabeth Allen
 Al Lewis
 James Brown
 Mike Evans
 Patrick Quinn
 Pedro Gonzalez-Gonzalez
 Franklin Cover
 Yvonne De Carlo
 Don Knotts
 Jack Warden
 Glenn Ford
 Jack Palance

References

External links
 SAG Awards official site 

2006
2006 film awards
2006 television awards
2006 guild awards
Screen
Screen Actors Guild
Screen
January 2007 events in the United States